The Mark 48 and its improved Advanced Capability (ADCAP) variant are American heavyweight submarine-launched torpedoes. They were designed to sink deep-diving nuclear-powered submarines and high-performance surface ships.

History
The Mark 48 was initially developed as REsearch TORpedo Concept II (RETORC II), one of several weapons recommended for implementation by Project Nobska, a 1956 summer study on submarine warfare. The Mk-48 torpedo was designed at the end of the 1960s to keep up with the advances in Soviet submarine technology. Operational since 1972, it replaced the Mk-37, Mk-14 and Mk-16  torpedoes as the principal weapon of U.S. Navy submarines. With the entry into service of the new Soviet  in 1977, the decision was made to accelerate the ADCAP program, which would bring significant modifications to the torpedo. Tests were run to ensure that the weapon could keep up with the developments and the weapon was modified with improved acoustics and electronics. The new version of the weapon, also known as Mk-48 Mod 5, was extensively tested and production started in 1985, with entry into service in 1988. From then on, various upgrades have been added to the torpedo.  Mk-48 Mod 6 was in service; a Mod 7 version was test fired in 2008 in the Rim of Pacific Naval exercises. The inventory of the U.S. Navy in 2001 was 1,046 Mk-48 torpedoes.  In 2017 Lockheed's production was approximately 50 per year.

Deployment
The Mk-48 torpedo is designed to be launched from submarine torpedo tubes. The weapon is carried by all U.S. Navy submarines, including  ballistic missile submarines and -, -, and  attack submarines. It is also used on Canadian, Australian, and Dutch submarines. The Royal Navy elected not to buy the Mark 48, preferring to use the Spearfish instead.

Mk-48 and Mk-48 ADCAP torpedoes can be guided from a submarine by wires attached to the torpedo. They can also use their own active or passive sensors to execute programmed target search, acquisition, and attack procedures. The torpedo is designed to detonate under the keel of a surface ship, breaking the keel and destroying its structural integrity. In the event of a miss, it can circle back for another attempt.

Propulsion
The swashplate piston engine is fueled by Otto fuel II, a monopropellant which combusts to drive the engine. The thrust is generated by a propulsor assembly.

Sensors and improvements
The torpedo's seeker has an active electronically steered "pinger" (2D phased array sonar) that helps avoid having to  maneuver as it approaches the target. Unconfirmed reports indicate that the torpedo's sensors can monitor surrounding electrical and magnetic fields. This may refer to the electromagnetic coils on the warhead (at least from 1977 to 1981), used to sense the metallic mass of the ship's hull and detonate at the proper stand-off distance.

The torpedo has been the subject of continued improvement over its service lifetime. 
In the 1990s, a Mod 6 variant of the ADCAP provided much improved noise isolation for the engine, which makes this torpedo more difficult to detect for a potential target.

The Mk48 Mod 7 Common Broadband Advanced Sonar System (CBASS) torpedo is optimized for both the deep and littoral waters and has advanced counter-countermeasure capabilities. The MK48 ADCAP Mod 7 (CBASS) torpedo is the result of a Joint Development Program with the Royal Australian Navy and reached Initial Operational Capability in 2006. The modular Mod 7 variant increases sonar bandwidth, enabling it to transmit and receive pings over a wider frequency band, taking advantage of broadband signal processing techniques to greatly improve search, acquisition, and attack effectiveness. This version is much more resistant to enemy countermeasures.

In 2015 the USN announced plans to restart production and seek a more modular design. Lockheed Martin is to upgrade existing Mark 48s to include a new guidance-control system known as the Common Broadband Advanced Sonar System (CBASS), in addition to improving propulsion and resistance to electronic countermeasures.

Starting in 2003, the US Navy began the Stealth Torpedo Enhancement Program which aims to upgrade the capability of the existing Mk 48 design by implementing alternative fuel sources including electric fuel cells, and a "swim out" capability. The program is ongoing, with many details yet classified.

Operators

Current operators

Future operator
: in 2016 agreement was made to supply MK48 Mod6 AT to Taiwan; in May 2020, 18 torpedoes were sold for $180 million.

See also
 American 21 inch torpedo
 Baek Sang Eo (White Shark) torpedo
 Black Shark torpedo
 DM2A4
 F21 Artemis
 Futlyar
 Spearfish torpedo
 Tigerfish torpedo
 Torped 62
 Type 65 torpedo
 Type 89 torpedo
 Varunastra (torpedo)
 Yu-6 torpedo

References

External links 

Mk 48 at Raytheon Company
US Navy Fact File 

Cold War weapons of the United States
Military equipment introduced in the 1970s
Raytheon Company products
Torpedoes of the United States